Cambridge Angels is a leading UK business angel network providing smart capital from entrepreneurs to entrepreneurs. 

They are a collaborative Cambridge-based group, actively mentoring and investing in innovative teams and their ideas. Cambridge Angels equip generations of entrepreneurs to generate returns and help realise their full potential. They have a strong ethos of backing merit and supporting entrepreneurship.

Their members, most of whom are successful entrepreneurs, invest in a wide range of start-up and scale-up businesses with a particular focus on deep-tech, and tools and technologies supporting healthcare. 

The group was founded in 2001 by Robert Sansom and David Cleevely.

Investee companies 
A list of their portfolio companies can be found here: https://cambridgeangels.com/portfolio

Members and previous Chairs 

The current chair of Cambridge Angels is Pam Garside.  Previous Chairs include Robert Sansom, David Cleevely, John Yeomans, Peter Cowley and Simon Thorpe.

Cambridge Angels is a group of more than 60 high-net worth investors who have proven experience as successful entrepreneurs. Members invest in and mentor high quality start-up and early-stage companies in Cambridge, London, Oxford and throughout the UK.

Typical funding requirements that Cambridge Angels meet are in the range of £150k to £1.5m - although it is worth noting that several of their portfolio companies have raised significant follow-on funding from their Members and their venture capital partners over several funding rounds. 

Their Members have been responsible for a large number of the “Cambridge Phenomenon” success stories over recent years. Therefore, in addition to providing funding for early-stage companies, Cambridge Angels also offer start-ups the considerable benefit of a wide range of expertise, contacts and directly relevant experience in establishing and growing entrepreneurial businesses successfully.

See also 

 Comparison of business angel networks
 Private equity 
 Venture capital

References 

Financial services companies of the United Kingdom
Innovation in the United Kingdom
Investment companies of the United Kingdom